Harold "Harry" Hanford (9 October 1907 – 1996) was a Welsh footballer who made more than 300 appearances in the Football League playing for Swansea Town, Sheffield Wednesday and Exeter City. He was capped seven times for Wales at senior international level.

In the book by Geraint H Jenkins, 'Proud to be a Swan', Hanford is described as "a muscular, lantern-jawed stopper". Despite having been at the club for only a short time, he is a "veteran" of the Swansea City side struggling under the management of James Thomson towards the end of the 1920s. An inspirational figure in the side who, in times of economic hardship, regularly rallied the troops with the help of the "legendary" Joe Sykes and record Football League appearance holder for the Swans, Wilfred Milne.

Hanford was part of the giant killing Swansea Town side that saw off First division Stoke City in the third round of the 1935 FA Cup. Swansea were having a difficult season in division two that year but, goals from S Lowery (2) Hughie Blair and Walter Bussey helped them see off Stoke at the Vetch Field. Hanford played alongside Wilfred Milne, who still holds the club record for most appearances in the English Football League (586). However, the Swans went on to lose to Derby County in the fourth round.

References

1907 births
1996 deaths
Sportspeople from Neath Port Talbot
Welsh footballers
Wales international footballers
Association football defenders
Swansea City A.F.C. players
Sheffield Wednesday F.C. players
Exeter City F.C. players
English Football League players
Swindon Town F.C. wartime guest players